Krithidae is a family of marine ostracods belonging to the order Podocopida.

Genera

Genera:
 Austrokrithe Hartmann, 1994
 Dentokrithe Khosla & Haskins, 1980
 Eukrithe Shornikov, 1975
 Krithe Brady, Crosskey and Robertson, 1874
 Parakrithe Van den Bold, 1958
 Parakrithella Hanai, 1959
 Pseudoparakrithella Purper, 1979 †
 Pseudopsammocythere Carbonnel, 1966
 Thracella Soenmez, 1963 †
 Turmaekrithe Pietrzeniuk, 1969 †

References

Ostracods